The Rizal Commercial Banking Corporation, commonly known as RCBC, is one of the largest universal banks in the Philippines with total consolidated resources of Php 959 billion. It was established in 1960 as a development bank and is licensed by the Bangko Sentral ng Pilipinas (BSP) for both commercial and investment banking.

RCBC is majority-owned by the Yuchengco Group of Companies (YGC), one of the oldest and largest conglomerates in Southeast Asia covering over 60 businesses which include the non-life insurance company, Malayan Insurance, a life insurance company joint venture with Sun Life Financial Philippines, SunLifeGREPA Financial, Inc.; the construction company EEI Corp.; educational institutions; and vehicle dealerships. Other significant investors of the bank include the World Bank's International Finance Corporation, Cathay Life Insurance Co., Ltd., a wholly owned subsidiary of Cathay Financial Holding, Ltd., and CVC Capital Partners. RCBC issues first US dollar sustainability bonds. RCBC issues VISA, Mastercard, JCB, and UnionPay credit cards through RCBC Bankard.

History
In 2000, RCBC acquired major control of Bankard Inc, a credit card company. In 2006, the acquisition of almost all assets of Bankard was approved.

In 2007, RCBC acquired the thrift bank Merchants Savings and Loan Association Inc. from Finman Capital Corp. and consolidated it with its own thrift bank RCBC Savings Bank with the aim for increasing its branch network. In 2009, RCBC acquired JP Laurel Rural Bank in Batangas to expand microfinance operations to Luzon. On October 28, 2013, RCBC's microfinance subsidiary, Rizal Microbank opened the very first banking office made of recycled shipping container vans in the Philippines. On 2012, RCBC acquired First Malayan Leasing and Finance Corporation and its subsidiary Malayan Rental to enter equipment leasing business.

In 2016, some funds from the Bangladesh Bank robbery incident were diverted to fictitious accounts at the Jupiter Street branch of RCBC. Some executives were charged with anti-money laundering.

In 2019, RCBC raised PHP15 billion in Peso Bond, the Philippines’ first green finance framework under the ASEAN Green Bond Standards. In June 2019, the Bangko Sentral ng Pilipinas (BSP) approved RCBC's merger with its thrift bank RCBC Savings Bank.

In early 2020, RCBC's board approved a new digital banking platform through the creation of its wholly owned rural bank. On July 2020, RCBC launched its digital bank DiskarTech offering an interest rate of 3.25% per annum with no minimum deposit and maintaining balance. After the Bangko Sentral ng Pilipinas (BSP) released the guidelines for digital banks in December 2020, RCBC's executives said that they have not yet finalized a decision if they will apply for a separate digital bank license.

See also
BancNet

References

External links

Reuters, Stock Quote

Banks established in 1960
Banks of the Philippines
Companies based in Makati
Companies listed on the Philippine Stock Exchange
Philippine companies established in 1960